Trichotrimicra is a genus of crane fly in the family Limoniidae.

Distribution
South Africa, Kenya, Uganda, Nigeria, Congo and Rwanda

Species
T. antilopa (Alexander, 1960)
T. flavidella Alexander, 1972
T. hirtipennis (Alexander, 1921)
T. majuscula (Alexander, 1956)
T. medleri Alexander, 1974
T. rectangula Alexander, 1975
T. subnuda (Alexander, 1956)
T. tchaka (Alexander, 1960)
T. vanstraeleni (Alexander, 1956)

References

Limoniidae
Diptera of Africa